Entre Rios is a municipality in the state of Santa Catarina in the South region of Brazil. It was created in 1995 out the existing municipality of Marema.

See also
List of municipalities in Santa Catarina

References

Municipalities in Santa Catarina (state)